Kate Hodgson may refer to:

 Kate S Hodgson, archaeologist
 Kate Hodgson, actress